August 4, 1964 is an oratorio for mezzo-soprano, soprano, tenor, baritone, choir, and orchestra written by the American composer Steven Stucky with a libretto by Gene Scheer.  It was commissioned by the Dallas Symphony Orchestra in honor of the centennial of the birth of 36th U.S. President Lyndon B. Johnson.  The piece premiered September 18, 2008 at the Morton H. Meyerson Symphony Center in Dallas, with conductor Jaap van Zweden leading mezzo-soprano Kelley O'Connor, soprano Laquita Mitchell, baritone Robert Orth, tenor Vale Rideout, the Dallas Symphony Chorus, and the Dallas Symphony Orchestra.  The work specifically follows the events of August 4, 1964 during Johnson's presidency, including the Gulf of Tonkin incident and the discovered bodies of three murdered civil rights workers in Neshoba County, Mississippi.

The piece was nominated for the 2013 Grammy Award for Best Classical Contemporary Composition.

Composition
Librettist Gene Scheer based the text of August 4, 1964 on various diaries, letters, news reports, and other historical documents regarding the day's events.  The work explores its narrative from two perspectives: those of the grieving mothers of James Chaney and Andrew Goodman, and those of Johnson and Secretary of Defense Robert McNamara in the Oval Office.  On the inspiration for the work, Stucky recalled:
The piece is scored for choir, orchestra, and four vocal soloists cast in historic roles:
Mrs. Goodman, mezzo-soprano
Mrs. Chaney, soprano
President Lyndon B. Johnson, baritone
Secretary of Defense Robert S. McNamara, tenor

Structure
A performance of August 4, 1964  lasts approximately 70 minutes.  The work is composed in twelve movements:
The Saddest Moment
Historians
Oval Office 1
I Wish to Be a Part of that Fight
The Secret Heart of America
Oval Office 2
Elegy
Letter from Mississippi
Oval Office 3
August Fourth
Had We Known
What is Precious is Never to Forget

Reception
Reviewing the world premiere of August 4, 1964, James R. Oestreich of The New York Times praised the piece as "a complex tribute to a complex man with a deeply divided legacy" and added, "Mr. Scheer created a tapestry of overlapping streams of consciousness, and Mr. Stucky responded with a varied, colorful and mercurial score."  Alex Ross of The New Yorker said of the work, "In Stucky’s piece, formidable vocal and instrumental resources are marshalled to evoke, in a virtuosically eclectic style, the passions and flaws of a monumental figure."  Paul Kirby of Theater Jones further elaborated:
Scott Cantrell of The Dallas Morning News was notably more critical.  Despite calling Stucky "a master of orchestral writing," Cantrell ultimately described the vocal writing as "serviceable, but often stilted" and said of the work, "It’s a strange pièce d’occasion, and too expensive with the demanding solo and chorus parts to attract many other performances. The money and efforts might have gone to something promising more of an afterlife."

References

Compositions by Steven Stucky
2008 compositions
Oratorios
21st-century classical music
Music commissioned by the Dallas Symphony Orchestra
Cultural depictions of Lyndon B. Johnson